Webster Griffin Tarpley (born September 1946) is an American author, political activist, and conspiracy theorist. A one-time follower of Lyndon LaRouche, Tarpley is known for his role in the 9/11 truth movement, believing 9/11 was a false flag operation.

Education
Tarpley was born in Pittsfield, Massachusetts, in 1946. After receiving a Bachelor of Arts in Languages from Princeton University in 1966, summa cum laude and Phi Beta Kappa, he became a Fulbright Scholar at the University of Turin, Italy. Later, he earned a Master of Arts in humanities from Skidmore College and a Ph.D. in early modern history from the Catholic University of America.

Career
In 1971, Tarpley was on the editorial board of The Campaigner, a National Caucus of Labor Committees' journal, according to its masthead. In 1986, Tarpley attempted to run on Lyndon LaRouche's U.S. Labor Party platform in the New York State Democratic Party primary for the U.S. Senate, but was ruled off the ballot in August that year because of a defect in his nominating petitions.

At one time, Tarpley was a contributing editor to the Executive Intelligence Review (EIR), a LaRouche movement publication. In a January 1987 press conference attended only by a reporter from The Washington Post, he claimed the LaRouche movement's credit card indictments were part of a plot against LaRouche who he described as "the front-runner for the Democratic presidential nomination" in the following year's election. Soviet leader Mikhail Gorbachev, Tarpley claimed, had used a surreptitious message in a speech to demand the silencing of LaRouche because of supposed information in LaRouche's possession on Soviet involvement in the assassination of Olof Palme, the former Swedish prime minister. In 1992, Tarpley co-authored with Anton Chaitkin George Bush: The Unauthorized Biography, published by LaRouche's EIR magazine.

Since March 2006, Tarpley has hosted a weekly online talk show called World Crisis Radio, broadcast by GCNLive.com.

Conspiracy theories

Tarpley maintains that the September 11 attacks were engineered by a rogue network of the military-industrial complex and intelligence agencies as a false-flag operation. The common account about the events of 9/11 are in Tarpley's opinion in 2006 an "outrageous myth" and an "absurd fairy tale." The organisations involved in 9/11 apparently included Britain's MI6 as well as "government officials loyal to the invisible government."

On November 21, 2011, while traveling to Syria, Tarpley told Syria's Addounia TV that the Syrian Civil War was a NATO–CIA ploy to destabilize Syria using mercenaries and death squads against the population and the Syrian government.

On April 2, 2012, C-SPAN aired 9/11, False Flags, and Black Ops: An Evening of Debate, in which Tarpley debated his critic Jonathan Kay on conspiracy theories, specifically the truth behind the September 11, 2001, terrorist attacks. David Frum, who served as moderator between the two men, described Tarpley's "presentation as as involuted as it was long-winded." During the event, Tarpley said that the Attack on Pearl Harbor was also a government conspiracy.

On June 7, 2012, interviewed for the NRK (Norwegian Broadcasting Corporation) regarding the 2011 Norway attacks, Tarpley said, "I believe that the evidence points to a private network, or even a NATO network, within the police that contributed the long time delay until they stormed the Island."

Tarpley has said Edward Snowden is probably a triple agent ultimately being an agent for the CIA with the aim of weakening President Barack Obama and pushing him into intervening in Syria.

On January 21, 2015, Tarpley was interviewed by Guns and Butter's Bonnie Faulkner about "geopolitical terrorism and the destabilization of governments and how others like Russia and Belarus are responding".

Tarpley is a member of the "world anti-imperialist conference" Axis for Peace, of Scholars for 9/11 Truth and of a research Netzwerk of German 9/11 authors founded in September 2006. Tarpley has also given lectures what he terms the "Versailles thesis", which claims that the British government attempted to create a new "world order" at the Treaty of Versailles.

Melania Trump libel suit
In February 2017, he agreed to settle a libel suit brought by U.S. First Lady Melania Trump for publishing a "false and defamatory" report In August 2016 alleging that the First Lady had been a "high-end escort" prior to meeting President Donald Trump. Terms of the settlement included providing a public apology in writing and paying a "substantial sum".

Selected publications
Articles
"Palmerston's London During the 1850s: A Tour of the Human, Multicultural Zoo." Executive Intelligence Review, vol. 21, no. 16 (Apr. 15, 1994). Full issue.

Books
Chi ha ucciso Aldo Moro? [Who Killed Aldo Moro?] Study commissioned by the Italian Parliamentary Giuseppe Zamberletti (DC) and published in Rome, 1978. It sheds light on the affiliation between the Red Brigades and the neofascist P2 lodge and the role of the Italian intelligence services in the Operation Gladio/Anglo-American secret services.
George Bush: The Unauthorized Biography, with Anton Chaitkin (1992); Reprinted (2004). .
Against Oligarchy: Essays and Speeches, 1970-1996 (1996).
Surviving the Cataclysm: Your Guide through the Worst Financial Crisis in Human History (1999); updated (2009). .
9/11 Synthetic Terror: Made in USA – Myth of the 21st Century. Foreword by Thierry Meyssan (2005). ; 5th ed.: (Nov. 2011). .
Française: La Terreur Fabriquée, Made in USA: 11 Septembre, le mythe du XXIe siècle (Sep. 2006). .
Italiano: La Fabbrica del Terrore (Sep. 2007). .
Español: 11-S, El Falso Terrorismo (Jan. 2008). .
Obama & The Postmodern Coup: Making of a Manchurian Candidate (Apr. 2008). .
German: Barack Obama: Wie ein US-Präsident gemacht wird (Aug. 2008). .
Japanese: Obama: Dangerous Geometry (Nov. 2008). .
Barack H. Obama: The Unauthorized Biography (Aug. 2008). .
Japanese: (Mar. 2009).
Just Too Weird: Bishop Romney and the Mormon Takeover of America: Polygamy, Theocracy, and Subversion (Oct. 2012). .

References

External links

”Biographies of Some People Who Have Appeared on The LaRouche Connection: Webster Tarpley“. 2002. larouchepub.com.
Genesis Communications Network: World Crisis Radio (Tarpley's radio show)
Webster Tarpley Radio on YouTube
Works by Webster Tarpley at Internet Archive.

1946 births
Living people
Anti-corporate activists
Catholic University of America alumni
Flushing High School alumni
LaRouche movement
Maryland Democrats
Princeton University alumni
Skidmore College alumni
Writers from Pittsfield, Massachusetts
American conspiracy theorists
9/11 conspiracy theorists